The Garodi are a Muslim community found in the state of Maharashtra in India. They are also known as Sampagarudi, Madari Baorikar and Gare.

Origin
The Garodi are a community of Madari Faqirs, and are found in the districts of Kolhapur, Sangli and Pune.  They speak the Dakhani dialect of Urdu, but most also speak Marathi.

Present circumstances

The Garodi are an endogamous group with four exogamous sub-divisions. These sub-divisions are the Paroh, Pansitea, Bastasi and Bobad. Marriage within the sub-divisions is strictly forbidden. They are a landless community, who specialise in juggling and snake charming. The Garodi are Sunni Muslim, but incorporate many folk customs. They have set up a caste association, the Garodi Samaj, which acts as a community welfare organization.

See also
 Madari

References

Social groups of Maharashtra
Muslim communities of India
Muslim communities of Maharashtra